Myristica fissurata is a species of plant in the family Myristicaceae. It is endemic to Maluku, Indonesia.

References

fissurata
Endemic flora of the Maluku Islands
Trees of the Maluku Islands
Vulnerable plants
Taxonomy articles created by Polbot